The 2020 French municipal elections were held from 15 March to 28 June to renew the municipal councils of the approximately 35,000 French communes. 
The first round took place on 15 March and the second round was postponed to 28 June due to the COVID-19 pandemic.

Electoral system 
Municipal elections in France result in the renewal of the members of municipal councils in every commune, and are held every 6 years. With the exception of Paris, Lyon, and Marseille, the electoral subdivision is the commune itself. In Paris, separate elections are held for each arrondissement, as is the case in Lyon, where elections are also held by arrondissement; in Marseille, elections are held within sectors containing two arrondissements each.

Election is open to European citizens living in the country, but since 2020, 800 English/British people have lost their electoral capacities due to Brexit.

The number of municipal councillors within each commune is dependent upon its population, from a minimum of 7 for communes with a population less than 100 to 69 for those with a population of 300,000 or more (with the exception of the three largest cities). The electoral system within each commune is also dependent on its population.

In communes with fewer than 1,000 inhabitants, two-round majority-at-large voting with panachage is used, with candidates elected in the first round should they receive an absolute majority of votes cast and at least a quarter of the number of individuals registered on the electoral rolls. The remaining seats are filled in the second round, in which only a plurality of votes is required to be elected. The requirement for gender parity is also void in these smaller communes.

In communes with 1,000 or more inhabitants, electoral lists contest a two-round proportional representation system with a majority bonus. Should a list receive an absolute majority of votes cast in the first round, it will receive half of all seats and the rest of the seats will be distributed proportionally among electoral lists with at least 5% of votes using the D'Hondt method. If a second round is necessitated, only lists which received at least 10% of valid votes in the first round proceed, and may merge with other lists which received at least 5% of votes cast in the first round. Seats are then allocated using the same method as the first round, guaranteeing a majority for the list with a relative majority of votes.

In the three largest cities, the election of municipal councils and arrondissement councils takes place simultaneously, and follow the same electoral method as that for communes with 1,000 or more inhabitants within each electoral division (whether arrondissement or sector). Mayors are elected in a two-round secret ballot requiring an absolute majority, and otherwise with a plurality of votes from municipal councillors if a third round is required.

The election of councillors to intercommunal structures also takes place concurrently with the municipal elections; in communes with fewer than 1,000 inhabitants, they are chosen "in the order of the table" (mayors, deputy mayors, and councillors), while in larger communes, they are elected simultaneously.

The number of municipal councillors elected in each commune is determined as a function of its population, ranging from 7 to 69 in all communes except for the three largest cities.

Opinion polls 
=== National ===
The Harris Interactive poll was based on communes with a population of at least 10,000.

By commune

Bordeaux 
The April 2018 and May 2019 Ifop polls were commissioned by Esprit Bordeaux, an association founded by supporters of Alain Juppé, later backing Nicolas Florian.

Lille

First round 
The March 2019 OpinionWay poll was sponsored by The Republicans, while La République En Marche! commissioned the BVA poll conducted in October 2018, which did not specify a specific LR candidate.

Second round

Lyon

Marseille 
The February 2019 Ifop poll was commissioned by Génération engagement, the financing association of Bruno Gilles, the PollingVox polls by l'Association des Amis de Martine Vassal (with Bruno Gilles as a miscellaneous right candidate in June 2019), and the February 2018 Ifop poll by Cap sur l'avenir 13, the micro-party of Renaud Muselier.

Marseille's 5th sector 
The May 2019 BVA poll was commissioned by Les amis de Lionel Royer-Perreaut, the micro-party of its namesake.

Montpellier 
The March 2018 Ifop poll was commissioned by Mohed Altrad.

Mulhouse 
The September 2018 OpinionWay poll was paid for by the city of Mulhouse and the outgoing majority led by Michèle Lutz.

Nancy 
The June 2019 Ifop poll was conducted on behalf of the Socialist Party (PS).

First round

Second round

Nanterre

Nantes 
The June 2019 Ifop poll was conducted on behalf of the Socialist Party (PS).

First round

Second round

Nice

First round 
The Ifop poll conducted in December 2017 tested a "miscellaneous right and centre of the municipal majority" list led by Christian Estrosi in the event that Éric Ciotti headed a list representing The Republicans (LR) as well as considering Robert Injey as heading a list for La France Insoumise, and was commissioned by Les Amis de Christian Estrosi.

Second round

Nîmes

First round

Second round

Paris 
The March 2019 Ifop poll did not name a specific EELV candidate. The January 2019 Viavoice poll was conducted for La République En Marche!, and did not test any potential candidates other than Benjamin Griveaux. The September 2018 Ifop poll scenario including Cédric Villani was commissioned by CFHJ, owned by a friend of Villani, and the June 2019 Ifop poll was also conducted on behalf of Villani.

First round

Second round

Perpignan

Toulon

Toulouse

2019 European elections in communes with at least 100,000 inhabitants

Results 

Both La République En Marche! and National Rally lost numerous seats and mayorships. La République En Marche! managed to retain mayorship of Le Havre by the Prime minister Edouard Philippe (he resigned national position on 3 July). National Rally by itself lost about half of its representatives.
Louis Aliot became the first National Rally Mayor in Perpignan with a city of more than 100,000 people (although Aliot ran as independent). 
Les Republicains also suffered losses. Most of them were in large cities, where mayorships were lost to the Greens, although Les Republicains lost seats to the National Rally in small towns.

The Greens made significant gains in the election. They triumphed in Lyon, Marseille, Nancy, Strasbourg and Bordeaux. Anne Hidalgo and Martine Aubry retained their respective mayoralties of Paris and Lille. Including them, female candidates won in half of France's largest cities. Only 40% of the electorate participated in the second round, a significant drop from the prior local elections, likely due to concerns regarding the COVID-19 pandemic.

Marie Cau was elected the first transgender mayor in France, in Tilloy-lez-Marchiennes.

National results

Communes with at least 70,000 inhabitants 
Incumbent mayors marked with an asterisk (*) did not seek another term in 2020.

See also 
2020 Paris municipal election
2022 French presidential election
2019 European Parliament election in France

References

External links 

Municipal
France
2020